Fellows of the Royal Society elected in 1779.

Fellows

 Robert Bromfield (d. 1786)
 George Buxton (1730–1805), physicist
 Tiberius Cavallo (1745–1809), Italian physicist
 Henry Dagge (b. c.1715)
 Josias Dupre (1721–1780), Governor of Madras
 John Duroure (c.1751–1801)
 John Eardley-Wilmot (1750–1815), barrister
 Samuel Farr (1741–1795), physician
 William Fullarton (1754–1808), soldier and diplomat
 James Glenie (1750–1817), Scottish businessman
 John Grant
 Edward Whitaker Gray (1748–1806), librarian
 Hugh Hamersley (d. 1790)
 John Henniker, 1st Baron Henniker (1724–1803)
 John Jebb (1736–1786), physician and reformer
 John Jennings
 Andrew Kippis (1726–1795), clergyman
 James Murray (c.1722–1794), Governor of Quebec
 Ralph Payne, 1st Baron Lavington (1738–1807)
 Joseph Poli (1746–1825)
 John Joshua Proby, 1st Earl of Carysfort (1751–1828)
 Charles Rainsford (1728–1809), Army officer
 Robert Richardson (1732–1781) prebendary, Lincoln Cathedral
 John Robertson (1741–1823), physician
 William Seward (1747–1799), anecdotist
 Samuel Foart Simmons (1750–1813), physician
 James Carmichael Smyth (1741–1821), Scottish physician
 Benjamin Thompson, Count Rumford (1753–1814)
 John Topham (1746–1803)
 Michael Tyson (1740–1780), clergyman
 Thomas Vage (d. 1815)
 Thomas Francis Wenman (1745–1796), natural historian
 John Whitehurst (1713–1788), clockmaker

References

1779 in science
1779
1779 in Great Britain